The River is the debut single from Noel Gourdin from his debut album After My Time. Its intro features a sample from Millie Jackson's 1974 single "How Do You Feel The Morning After". The two songs share the same chord progression and have melodical similarities. Consequently, its two writers, Luther Lynch and Raeford Gerald, received songwriting credits on this song.

The single spent 15 weeks on the Hot Adult R&B Airplay and peaked at #7. It spent 22 weeks on the Hot R&B/Hip-Hop Songs, and peaked at #23. The song appears in the film Welcome Home, Roscoe Jenkins.

Chart

This song is also played on many radio stations.

References

2007 singles
Songs written by Balewa Muhammad
2007 songs
Epic Records singles
Songs written by KayGee